Reeja Johnson, better known by her stage name Mallika, is an Indian actress, who has mainly appeared in Malayalam and Tamil films.

Career
After debuting in the Malayalam film Nizhalkuthu (2002), she played a significant role in Cheran's Autograph, following which she played supporting roles in several Tamil films. She later went on to play in a tele-serial called Anjali. She won the Filmfare Award for Best Supporting Actress for her role in Autograph. In 2012, she won a Special Mention from the Jury at the 59th National Film Awards for her performance in the film, Byari, the first ever feature film made in Beary language.

Personal life
Mallika is born to Johnson and Reetha at Thrissur, Kerala.

Awards
 2004 : Filmfare Award for Best Supporting Actress -Autograph  
 2012 : National Film Awards  Special Mention from the Jury - Byari  
 2013 : Kerala Film Critics Association Awards - Second Best Actress

Filmography

Television

References

External links
 

Actresses from Thrissur
Actresses in Tamil cinema
Indian film actresses
Living people
Actresses in Malayalam cinema
Filmfare Awards South winners
21st-century Indian actresses
Year of birth missing (living people)
Actresses in Kannada cinema
Actresses in Telugu cinema
Special Mention (feature film) National Film Award winners